Frederick George Byron  (1764 –  1792), was an English amateur artist and caricaturist, and an uncle of the  poet the 6th Lord Byron.

Many of his works are unsigned and have frequently been attributed to other artists; in particular some of his works closely resemble those of Thomas Rowlandson.
He made numerous plates for William Holland, between 1788–91, see  the Catalogue of Political and Personal Satires Preserved in the Department of Prints and Drawings in the British Museum.
 
Byron exhibited at the Society of Artists of Great Britain in 1791. His large plates of France from 1790 are discussed in Bordes, 1992.

References

External links
 Frederick George Byron (British Museum Bio)

1764 births
1792 deaths
18th-century engravers
English engravers
English caricaturists